The Pharaoh's daughter in the story of the finding of Moses in the biblical Book of Exodus is an important, albeit minor, figure in Abrahamic religions. Though some variations of her story exist, the general consensus among Jews, Christians, and Muslims is that she is the adoptive mother of the prophet Moses. Muslims identify her with Asiya, the Great Royal Wife of the pharaoh. In either version, she saved Moses from certain death from both the Nile river and from the Pharaoh. As she ensured the well-being of Moses throughout his early life, she played an essential role in lifting the Hebrew slaves out of bondage in Egypt, their journey to the Promised Land, and the establishment of the Ten Commandments.

Her name 
The Book of Exodus (Exodus 2:5) does not give a name to Pharaoh's daughter, or to her father; she is referred to in Hebrew as simply the Bat-Paroh, a Hebrew phrase that literally translates to "daughter of Pharaoh." The Book of Jubilees (Jubilees 47:5) and Josephus both name her as Thermouthis, also transliterated as Tharmuth and Thermutis, the Greek name of Renenutet, the Egyptian snake deity. Meanwhile, Leviticus Rabbah (Leviticus Rabbah 1:3) and the Books of Chronicles (1 Chronicles 4:18) refer to her as Bit-Yah, also transliterated as Batyah and Bithiah, and it is written that she is given the name for her adoption of Moses, that because she had made Moses her son, Yahweh would make her his daughter. Also in the Books of Chronicles (1 Chronicles 4:18), she is called ha-yehudiyyah, which some English translations of the Bible treat as a given name, Jehudijah, notably the King James Version, but the word is actually an appelative, there to indicate that Pharaoh's daughter was no longer a pagan. In Christianity, she is also named as Merris and Merrhoe.

In Judaism 
In the Jewish narrative, Pharaoh's daughter first appears in the Book of Exodus, in Exodus 2:5-10. The passage describes her discovery of the Hebrew child, Moses, in the rushes of the Nile River and her willful defiance of her father's orders that all male Hebrew children be drowned in the "Yeor" (Nile), instead taking the child, whom she knows to be a Hebrew, and raising him as her own son. The Talmud and the Midrash Vayosha provide some additional backstory to the event, saying that she had visited the Nile that morning not to bathe for the purpose of hygiene but for ritual purification, treating the river as if it were a mikveh, as she had grown tired of people's idolatrous ways, and that she first sought to nurse Moses herself but he would not take her milk and so, she called for a Hebrew wet nurse, who so happened to be Moses' biological mother, Jochebed. Rabbinic literature tells a significantly different take on the events that day, portraying Pharaoh's daughter as having suffered from a skin disease (possibly leprosy), the pain of which only the cold waters of the Nile could relieve, and that these lesions healed when she found Moses. It also describes an encounter with the archangel Gabriel, who kills two of her handmaidens for trying to dissuade her from rescuing Moses. After Moses is weaned, Pharaoh's daughter gives him his name, Moshé purportedly taken from the word māšāh, because she drew him from the water, but some modern scholars disagree with the Biblical etymology of the name, believing it to have been based on the Egyptian root m-s, meaning "son" or "born of," a popular element in Egyptian names (e. g. Ramesses. Thutmose) used in conjunction with a namesake deity. In her later years, Pharaoh's daughter devotes herself to Moses, and to Yahweh; she celebrates the first Passover Seder with Moses in the slaves' quarters and for that, her firstborn is the only Egyptian to survive the final of the Ten Plagues of Egypt, and leaves Egypt with him for the Promised Land. In the Books of Chronicles, (1 Chronicles 4:18), she is said to have married a member of the Tribe of Judah, Mered, and to have had children with him, and she is referred to as a Jewess, indicating that she had accepted Yahweh as her own god. Furthermore, the Jewish rabbis claim that, in the Book of Proverbs (Proverbs 31:15), she is praised in Woman of Valor.  Further, the Midrash teaches that because of her devotion to Yahweh and her adoption of Moses, she was one of those who entered heaven alive.

In Islam 

Pharaoh's daughter is not mentioned in any Islamic sources. However, in Islam, Pharaoh's wife Asiya bint Muzahim is mentioned. In Islam, Asiya does not draw Moses from river Nile, her servants do, and Pharaoh, having learned of the boy's existence, seeks to kill him but Asiya intervenes and Pharaoh changes his mind, allowing the boy to live. Mirroring the Judeo-Christian story, Jochebed is called to Pharaoh's palace to act as a wet nurse for him but then, her story, as told by Islam, deviates from the Judeo-Christian version once more, with Asiya being tortured to death at the hands of Pharaoh for professing a belief in God (Allah).

Art and culture
Pharaoh's daughter is often included in Exodus-related art and fiction. Several artworks portray the finding of Moses.

In George Gershwin's 1935 opera Porgy and Bess, the song It Ain't Necessarily So mentions Pharaoh's daughter finding baby Moses.

The Moses Chronicles (2015-), a novel-trilogy by H. B. Moore, includes Pharaoh's daughter. Parts of the story are written from her perspective.

Drama-films depicting her include The Ten Commandments (1956), the animated musical The Prince of Egypt (1998) and Exodus: Gods and Kings (2014).

TV-dramas include Moses (1995).

Gallery

See also
Entering heaven alive
Moses in rabbinic literature
List of names for the Biblical nameless

References

Bibliography 
 Encyclopaedia Judaica, 1972, Keter Publishing House, Jerusalem, Israel.
 Jewish Encyclopedia.com
Bithiah. (n.d.). Hitchcock's Bible Names Dictionary. Retrieved January 28, 2008, from Dictionary.com website: 

 
Converts to Judaism from paganism
Egypt in the Hebrew Bible
Jewish mythology
Moses
Book of Exodus people
Women in the Hebrew Bible
Entering heaven alive
Nile
Water and religion
Unnamed people of the Bible
Book of Jubilees